Phan Thong railway station is a railway station located in Phan Thong Subdistrict, Phan Thong District, Chonburi Province.

References 

Railway stations in Thailand
Chonburi province